Chief of the Kriegsmarine Personnel Office was a leading position within the German Kriegsmarine High Command in Nazi Germany.

List of chiefs

See also
Oberkommando der Kriegsmarine
Army Personnel Office (Wehrmacht) (army equivalent)
Chief of the Luftwaffe Personnel Office (air force equivalent)

References

Citations

Bibliography

 

Kriegsmarine